Abdul Rahman bin Musa'id Al Saud (born 18 August 1967) is a Saudi Arabian businessman, writer and the former president of Saudi football club Al-Hilal.

Biography
Prince Abdul Rahman was born in Paris on 18 August 1967. He is son of Prince Musa'id bin Abdulaziz Al Saud. He studied at Paris-Sorbonne University and King Saud University.

References

External links

Abdulrahman
Abdulrahman
1967 births
Al Hilal SFC presidents
Abdulrahman
Living people